The Pennsylvania Classic was an annual golf tournament for professional women golfers on the Futures Tour, the official developmental tour of the LPGA Tour. The event was  played from 2009 to 2011 at the Felicita Mountain Resort & Spa in Harrisburg, Pennsylvania.

In 2009, the title sponsor of the tournament was Turkey Hill, a chain of Pennsylvania convenience store/gas stations and its sister company, Turkey Hill Dairy, a dairy processor based in Conestoga, Pennsylvania.

The tournament was a 54-hole event, as are most Futures Tour tournaments, and included pre-tournament pro-am opportunities, in which local amateur golfers can play with the professional golfers from the Tour as a benefit for local charities. The benefiting charity of the Pennsylvania Classic was the Boys & Girls Club of Central Pennsylvania.

Tournament names through the years: 
2009: Turkey Hill Classic
2010–2011: Pennsylvania Classic

Winners

1Won in a sudden-death playoff
2Tournament shortened to 36 holes because of rain

Tournament records

References

External links

Futures Tour official website

Former Symetra Tour events
Golf in Pennsylvania
Sports in Harrisburg, Pennsylvania